Qaleh-ye Abd ol Hoseyn (also Romanized as Qal‘eh-ye ‘Abd ol Ḩoseyn; also known as Ḩājj Mon‘em and Qal‘eh-e Ḩājj ‘Abd ol Ḩoseyn) is a village in Miyan Ab-e Shomali Rural District, in the Central District of Shushtar County, Khuzestan Province, Iran. At the 2006 census, its population was 731, in 137 families.

References 

Populated places in Shushtar County